Gafat Armament Engineering Complex is one of the military production facilities of the Metals and Engineering Corporation. With its headquarters in Bishoftu, it specializes in producing wide range of infantry equipment that meet the requirement of the Ethiopian National Defense Force.

History
It was established in January 1986 as the Gafat Engineering Factory to fulfill the need for local manufacture of basic infantry equipment. It initially produced AK-47 automatic rifles and light machine guns, as well as maintenance. It was later expanded to manufacture PK machine guns, and automatic weapons attached on armoured vehicles and helicopters.

To fully utilize its manufacturing capacity, the complex has diversified by supplying various items for civilian use.

It is often believed that North Korean advisors assisted with manufacturing of small arms.

Products

Military products include: various types of automatic rifles and machine guns; 40mm grenade launchers;  various types of guns such as hand guns, strike dispensing guns, etc.; and sniper scopes.

Civilian products include: various plastic products; various products for different industries in construction; and various kitchen wares and household utensils.

See also
 Gafat people, an extinct ethnic group that historically provided military support to the Ethiopian Solomonic dynasty
 Sebastopol, a cannon produced in the Gafat foundry northeast of Debre Tabor, set up by Tewodros II to manufacture modern arms

References

FDRE Defence Industry, May 2008

Military industrial facilities of Ethiopia
Oromia Region